Aleksandr Selyava (born 17 May 1992) is a Belarusian professional footballer who plays for Russian club Rostov.

Club career
On 29 December 2021, he signed with Russian Premier League club Rostov until the end of the 2021–22 season with an option to extend.

Honours
Torpedo-BelAZ Zhodino
Belarusian Cup winner: 2015–16

Shakhtyor Soligorsk
Belarusian Premier League champion: 2020 
Belarusian Cup winner: 2018–19

Career statistics

References

External links
 
 
 Profile at BATE website
 Profile at pressball.by

1992 births
People from Byalynichy District
Living people
Belarusian footballers
Belarus international footballers
Belarus under-21 international footballers
Belarus youth international footballers
Association football midfielders
FC BATE Borisov players
FC Klechesk Kletsk players
FC Torpedo-BelAZ Zhodino players
FC Shakhtyor Soligorsk players
FC Dinamo Minsk players
FC Rostov players
Belarusian First League players
Belarusian Premier League players
Russian Premier League players
Belarusian expatriate footballers
Expatriate footballers in Russia
Belarusian expatriate sportspeople in Russia
Sportspeople from Mogilev Region